The 1989 NAIA women's basketball tournament was the ninth annual tournament held by the NAIA to determine the national champion of women's college basketball among its members in the United States and Canada.

Southern Nazarene defeated top-seeded Claflin in the championship game, 98–96, to claim the Redskins' first NAIA national title. 

The tournament was played in Kansas City, Missouri.

Qualification

The tournament field remained fixed at sixteen teams, with seeds assigned to the top eight teams.

The tournament utilized a simple single-elimination format. The national third-place game, for the two teams that lost in the semifinals, was eliminated for this tournament, reducing the number of games by one.

Bracket

See also
1989 NCAA Division I women's basketball tournament
1989 NCAA Division II women's basketball tournament
1989 NCAA Division III women's basketball tournament
1989 NAIA men's basketball tournament

References

NAIA
NAIA Women's Basketball Championships
1989 in sports in Missouri